Nicholas Furlong (born September 16, 1986) is an American singer, songwriter, and record producer. His work crosses several musical genres, ranging from dance, rock, and pop, to rap and hip-hop. He is best known for writing and singing vocals on "The Nights" by Avicii.

Furlong was initially mentored by songwriter and producer Ryan Tedder, while signed to his publishing company Patriot Games Publishing during the years of 2010–2011. Since 2012, he has gone on to work with a wide range of musicians from different genres, including Kygo, Steve Aoki, 5 Seconds of Summer, Big Time Rush, WALK THE MOON, All Time Low, blink-182, Travis Barker, Papa Roach, The Used, Sleeping With Sirens, and Fever 333.

Early life 
Furlong was born in Sacramento, California to Jennifer and Michael Furlong and raised in Carson City, Nevada. He is of English and Irish descent. A self-taught musician, he began writing and producing music at the age of 16. While still a junior in high school, he began recording his own songs and sharing them on various music sites, before being discovered by a music director at Midway Games and offered an opportunity to write music for video games. Furlong contributed to various game soundtracks in 2004–2005. At the age of 21, he moved to Los Angeles to pursue a career as a songwriter and producer.

Career

2010–2013: Career breakthrough 
Furlong had his first commercial success in 2010 as a co-writer of the Big Time Rush and Jordin Sparks' duet, "Count on You". The song was featured on the band's debut album BTR, which debuted at number three on the Billboard 200. Shortly after, Furlong signed a publishing deal with Ryan Tedder, where he worked with artists like Colbie Caillat, Jordin Sparks, Leona Lewis, and The Wanted. Furlong worked again with Big Time Rush in 2011, when he co-wrote "Time of Our Life" for their second album Elevate. The band shot a live music video for the song during the 2012 Nickelodeon Kids' Choice Awards, which premiered after the show.

In 2012, Furlong began transitioning into electronic music, after co-writing a song for Diplo's Express Yourself EP. "I'd always been a fan of dance music in general, but working on Diplo's project gave me a completely different perspective of the genre as a whole." Later that year, Furlong began collaborating with Steve Aoki, co-writing the single "Singularity". They would collaborate again in 2013, when Furlong wrote and featured as a vocalist on the single "Bring You To Life (Transcend)", which peaked at number 44 on the Billboard Dance/Electronic Songs chart. Furlong performed the song alongside Aoki at his 2013 concert in Los Angeles at the Shrine Exposition Hall, during which two Guinness World Records were set for "the longest scream by a crowd" and "most people simultaneously lighting glow sticks".

2014–2015: Commercial recognition
Furlong worked with 5 Seconds of Summer in 2014 for their debut self-titled album, co-writing "Everything I Didn't Say", "Social Casualty", and "Independence Day". Despite not being released as a single, "Everything I Didn't Say" debuted at number 24 on the Billboard Hot 100. The song was also featured on the band's live album LiveSOS. Later that year, Furlong worked with post-hardcore band Sleeping with Sirens co-writing "Kick Me", the first single off of their fourth studio album, Madness. The single peaked at number 23 on the Billboard Hot Rock Songs chart. "Kick Me" won an award for song of the year at the 2015 Alternative Press Music Awards.

In 2015, Furlong began working with All Time Low on their sixth studio album, Future Hearts, co-writing "Runaways" and "Don't You Go". The album was the highest-selling album worldwide its first week out, making it the band's highest debut ever. Later that year, Furlong co-wrote and co-produced "Game On", a song by Waka Flocka Flame featuring Good Charlotte, which served as the theme song of the Adam Sandler film Pixels. Pixels was released in 2D, 3D, and IMAX 3D on July 24, 2015. Furlong was also a co-writer on the Good Charlotte single, "Makeshift Love", which debuted at number nine on the Billboard Rock Charts. Variance Magazine claimed that 2015 was a "pivotal year" for the songwriter and producer.

Avicii single: "The Nights"
In addition to co-writing the lyrics, Furlong was also the vocalist of Avicii's single "The Nights". The single premiered on the soundtrack of FIFA 15 on September 23, 2014. It was released on December 1, 2014, on The Days / Nights EP, alongside Avicii's prior single "The Days", and as a single in the UK on January 11, 2015. "The Nights" peaked at number one on the UK Dance Chart, number six on the UK Singles Chart, and number ten on the Billboard Dance/Electronic Songs chart. As of March 2022, the single has accumulated more than one billion streams on Spotify. Furlong reportedly was also responsible for reaching out to director Rory Kramer to use footage from Kramer's YouTube channel for the official music video, which has since surpassed eight-hundred million views.

2016–present: AttaBoy Music 

In 2016, Furlong was brought on as executive producer, co-producer, and a songwriter for Papa Roach's ninth studio album, Crooked Teeth. The first single, titled "Help", was released February 17, 2017, and spent six consecutive weeks at number one on Billboard's Mainstream Rock Singles chart, making it the band's third number one Rock single in their career. The album's second single "American Dreams" reached number three on the charts. Furlong simultaneously co-produced and co-wrote several songs with All Time Low for their album Last Young Renegade, including the album's first single "Dirty Laundry", which reached No. 1 on the UK Rock Singles chart. Furlong is also credited as a co-writer on "Good Old Days" for blink-182's deluxe edition of their album California. On October 13, 2017, The Front Bottoms released Going Grey, produced and executive produced by Furlong.

Furlong worked with the politically charged rap-rock trio The Fever 333 in 2018, writing singles "Made an America", which was nominated for a Grammy Award for best rock performance, and "Burn It", which won the best song at the 2019 Kerrang! Awards. He also contributed as a songwriter to Logan Henderson's single "Pull Me Deep", which was the artist's first single to debut on the Billboard Top 40 chart. In 2019 Furlong was credited as a co-writer on several songs from 311's album Voyager. He also launched his own joint venture publishing company AttaBoy Music with Reach Global Publishing.

In 2020, Furlong worked as a producer and co-writer on the songs "Someday", a collaboration between Kygo and country artist Zac Brown, and "Supremacy" by The Fever 333, which was co-produced with John Feldmann and Travis Barker and interpolates the song "Rapture" by Blondie, listing Debbie Harry and Chris Stein as co-writers. In addition, he also co-wrote and produced "Hanging with Ghosts" by Yung Pinch featuring Good Charlotte and Goody Grace.

Furlong revealed his own project, The Dirty Rich, on September 14, 2020. The first single, titled "Hot American Summer", was released on September 28, 2020, via Furlong's independent record label AttaBoy Music.

Discography

Singles

As The Dirty Rich

As featured vocalist

Production and songwriting credits

Awards and nominations

References

External links
 
 

Living people
1986 births
American male singer-songwriters
American male rappers
People from Nevada
Rappers from Nevada
Pop rappers
American rock singers
Rap rock musicians
American dance musicians
American hip hop singers
American hip hop musicians
American male pop singers
Singer-songwriters from Nevada